The Journal of Functional Analysis is a mathematics journal published by Elsevier. Founded by Paul Malliavin, Ralph S. Phillips, and Irving Segal, its editors-in-chief are Daniel W. Stroock, Stefaan Vaes, and Cedric Villani.

It is covered in databases including Scopus, the Science Citation Index, and the SCImago Journal Rank service.

References

Elsevier academic journals
Mathematics journals
Publications established in 1967
Semi-monthly journals